Guido Caroli (9 May 1927 – 8 September 2021) was an Italian speed skater who competed from the late 1940s to the mid-1950s. He is best known for falling with the Olympic flame, which he lighted at the 1956 Winter Olympics in Cortina d'Ampezzo. Caroli also competed in three Winter Olympics, earning his best finish of 28th in the 10,000 m event at Oslo in 1952. He died on 8 September 2021, at the age of 94.

References

Guido Caroli's profile at Sports Reference.com

1927 births
2021 deaths
Italian male speed skaters
Olympic speed skaters of Italy
Speed skaters at the 1948 Winter Olympics
Speed skaters at the 1952 Winter Olympics
Speed skaters at the 1956 Winter Olympics
Olympic cauldron lighters